Leucorhynchia gorii is a species of sea snail, a marine gastropod mollusk in the family Skeneidae. Leucorhynchia is a genus of snails in the family Skeneidae.

Description
The length of the shell attains 1.5 mm.

Distribution
This marine species occurs off West Africa and off São Tomé and Principe.

References

 Rolán E. & Rubio F. (2012) A new species of the genus Leucorhynchia (Gastropoda, Turbinidae) from West Africa. Novapex 13(1): 29-32

External links
 To World Register of Marine Species

gorii
Gastropods described in 2012
Marine fauna of West Africa